National Council elections were held in Bhutan on 20 April 2018.

Electoral system
Twenty of the 25 members of the National Council are elected from single-member constituencies using first-past-the-post voting.

Results

References

National Council elections in Bhutan
Bhutan
National Council
Bhutan